Urban parks in Canada are areas for public recreation and enjoyment or natural preservation in cities in Canada.  They are often owned and operated by municipal governments and so are usually called 'municipal parks', and sometimes 'regional parks' depending on the park's features and local government structure.

The amount of total park space per person and as a percentage of the total land in Canadian cities varies substantially. Many Canadian cities are located near large provincial and national parks, and other rural areas such as "cottage country" which also provide recreation areas for urban dwellers but may reduce the incentives for cities to preserve parkland within municipal boundaries. Some Canadian urban parks may be neatly tended public gardens reminiscent of the old world, but many of the largest are completely undeveloped open spaces.

List by city

Calgary

Edmonton

Edmonton's North Saskatchewan River valley parks system is a  "ribbon of green" running through the city. It is the largest expanse of urban parkland in Canada. The city also maintains  of grass fields for sports and leisure.

Ottawa
In comparison to:
 of parkland per 1000 residents in New York City
 of parkland per 1000 residents in Montreal
 of parkland per 1000 residents in Toronto

Toronto
Toronto’s urban parks system consists of approximately 1,600 parks, totalling almost 8,000 hectares of municipal-owned parkland, which amounts to 12.7 per cent of the city’s land base. A number of urban parks are situated throughout Toronto, including the Toronto waterfront, the Toronto ravine system. In addition to parkland owned by the City of Toronto, the city is also home to a Rouge Park, a  national urban park managed by Parks Canada, an agency of the Government of Canada. Centred around the Rouge River and valley, the park encompasses the eastern portion of Toronto, and extends into the neighbouring municipalities of Markham, and Pickering. It is the largest urban park in Canada.

Vancouver

Whitehorse
The City of Whitehorse, Yukon encompasses some 41,900 hectares. In the 2010 Official Community Plan, the city created five new regional parks to reflect environmental and recreational values: Chadburn Lake Park, McIntyre Creek Park, McLean Lake Park, Paddy's Pond - Ice Lake Park, and Wolf Creek Park. Together, this regional park system encompasses 30% of the city's total area (12,655 hectares) with Chadburn Lake Park being the largest regional park at 7,550 hectares. A further 33% was set aside as the Green Space Network Plan to protect ecosystems, encourage connectivity, provide citywide outdoor recreation opportunities, and to promote compact development.

Winnipeg

See also

 List of Canadian protected areas
 List of National Parks of Canada
 List of urban parks by size

Notes

References

External links
 CBC News In Depth: Parks